General locotenent Constantin Croitoru (born 5 May 1952 in Dițești, Prahova County) was the Chief of the Romanian Air Force Staff until 30 January 2009.

He was discharged by the Minister of National Defense, Mihai Stănișoară, after it has been discovered that various weapons were missing from a military depot near Ciorogârla, Ilfov County.

Military career
He joined the military in 1974 after graduating from the Air Force Military School. He attended the courses of the Academy of High Military Studies from 1981 to 1983. After graduation, he was appointed Chief Instructor of the 70th Air Division. During his career he also was assigned as air base and air division commander at the Air Operational Command, Chief of Operations Directorate, and Deputy Director of the General Staff. His most recent appointment was Director of the General Directorate for Defense Intelligence. 

Croitoru has considerable flight experience; he has lodged some 1,500 flying hours on a variety of aircraft, including MiG-15, MiG-21 LanceR, MiG-29, and IAR 316.

Personal life
Constantin Croitoru is married and has a son.

Education
Air Force Military School, 1974
Military Academy, Air Force and Air defense Branch, 1983
Brigade/Regiment Commander Course, 1993
Improvement Course for Strategic Operation Management, 1996
National Defense College, 2001
English language advanced course, Canada, 2002
Teaching Personnel Training Course, Bucharest, 2006

Appointments
1974-1984 – pilot, chief-pilot and patrol leader, 57th Fighter Regiment
1984-1990 – Chief Instructor, 70th Air Division
1990-1994 – staff officer, Methodical Training Office, Air Force and Air Defense Staff
1994-1995 – Deputy Commander, responsible for flying operations, 70th Air Division
1995-1998 – Deputy Commander, responsible for flying operations, 1st Air Corps "Siret"
1998-2000 – Deputy Chief, Doctrine and Training, Air Force Staff
2000-2001 – Chief of Staff, 1st Air Division "Siret"
2001-2002 – Commander of the 90th Airlift Base
2002-2003 – Commander of the 1st Air Division
2003-2005 – Commander Main Air Operational Command
2005-2006 – Deputy Director General Staff
2006-2007 – Director of the General Directorate for Defense Intelligence
March 2007-January 2009 – Chief of Air Force Staff

Promotions
1977 – Second Lieutenant
1978 – Lieutenant
1981 - Captain
1986 – Major
1990 – Lieutenant Colonel
1994 – Colonel
2001 – Brigadier General
2004 – Major General
2006 – Lieutenant General

External links
 General Croitoru's biography on the Romanian Air Force website
 Reviewing the troops

References

|-

Romanian Air Force generals
People from Prahova County
1952 births
Living people